The Lower Northern Army Division (2. förd), was a division of the Swedish Army which operated in various forms from 1941 to 1997. Its staff was located in Östersund Garrison in Östersund.

History
The Lower Northern Army Division was raised on 1 August 1941 as the XII Division (XII. fördelningen), a doubling division of the II Army Division (II. arméfördelningen). The army division was directly subordinate to the military commander of the II Military District, while the Jämtland Ranger Regiment was responsible for raising and mobilization of the army division staff. On 1 October 1966, the designation was changed from being given in Roman numerals to Arabic numerals, that is, the division was termed the 12th Division (12. fördelningen). Through the Defence Act of 1977 it was decided that the army would be reduced in 1978 with two army divisions, thereby disbanding the 2nd Army Division (2. arméfördelningen) and the 16th Army Division (16. arméfördelningen). On 1 July 1993, the Lower Norrland Military District and the Upper Norrland Military District (Milo ÖN) were merged and formed the Northern Military District (Milo N). The army division, together with the Upper Northern Army Division, thus came under the military commander of the Northern Military District (Milo N).

Through the Defence Act of 1992, the Riksdag decided that the Swedish Armed Forces' war organization should reflect the peace organization. As of 1 July 1994, the army division staff, together with the Upper Northern Army Division, came to be organized as a cadre-organized unit within the Northern Military District. With the new organization, the army division adopted the name Lower Northern Army Division (2. förd). Prior to the Defence Act of 1996, the Swedish government proposed to the Riksdag that the war organization to be reduced. Where, among other things, the three military districts would be covered by each division staff. Of the six division staffs, three with division units and 13 army brigades would be maintained. Within the Northern Military District, the government proposed that the Lower Northern Army Division should be disbanded. On 13 December 1996, the Riksdag adopted the government's bill, which meant that the Lower Northern Army Division was disbanded on 31 December 1997.

Barracks and training areas
The division staff was initially located at Prästgatan in Östersund. In December 1993, the staff was moved to the former administrative building of Norrland Artillery Regiment, where it remained until it was disbanded on 30 June 1997.

Heraldry and traditions

Coat of arms
The coat of arms of the Eastern Army Division used from 1994 to 1997. Blazon: "Fess wavy vert, argent and azure; argent charged with a wolf passant sable. The shield surmounted two batons or, charged with open crowns azure in saltire."

Medals
In 1997, the Nedre norra fördelningens (2.förd) minnesmedalj ("Lower Northern Army Division (2.förd) Commemorative Merit") in silver (NednorrFördSMM) of the 8th size was established. The medal ribbon is divided in green, white and blue moiré.

Commanding officer
1943–1995: ?
1995–1997: Senior Colonel Björn Karlsson

Names, designations and locations

See also
Division

Footnotes

References

Notes

Print

Further reading

Östersund Garrison
Divisions of Sweden
Military units and formations established in 1941
Military units and formations disestablished in 1997
1941 establishments in Sweden
1997 disestablishments in Sweden
Disbanded units and formations of Sweden